Bone marrow is a semi-solid tissue found within the spongy (also known as cancellous) portions of bones. In birds and mammals, bone marrow is the primary site of new blood cell production (or haematopoiesis). It is composed of hematopoietic cells, marrow adipose tissue, and supportive stromal cells. In adult humans, bone marrow is primarily located in the ribs, vertebrae, sternum, and bones of the pelvis. Bone marrow comprises approximately 5% of total body mass in healthy adult humans, such that a man weighing 73 kg (161 lbs) will have around 3.7 kg (8 lbs) of bone marrow.

Human marrow produces approximately 500 billion blood cells per day, which join the systemic circulation via permeable vasculature sinusoids within the medullary cavity. All types of hematopoietic cells, including both myeloid and lymphoid lineages, are created in bone marrow; however, lymphoid cells must migrate to other lymphoid organs (e.g. thymus) in order to complete maturation.

Bone marrow transplants can be conducted to treat severe diseases of the bone marrow, including certain forms of cancer such as leukemia. Several types of stem cells are related to bone marrow. Hematopoietic stem cells in the bone marrow can give rise to hematopoietic lineage cells, and mesenchymal stem cells, which can be isolated from the primary culture of bone marrow stroma, can give rise to bone, adipose, and cartilage tissue.

Structure
The composition of marrow is dynamic, as the mixture of cellular and non-cellular components (connective tissue) shifts with age and in response to systemic factors. In humans, marrow is colloquially characterized as "red" or "yellow" marrow (respectively) depending on the prevalence of hematopoietic cells vs fat cells.  While the precise mechanisms underlying marrow regulation are not understood, compositional changes occur according to stereotypical patterns. For example, a newborn baby's bones exclusively contain hematopoietically active "red" marrow, and there is a progressive conversion towards "yellow" marrow with age. In adults, red marrow is found mainly in the central skeleton, such as the pelvis, sternum, cranium, ribs, vertebrae and scapulae, and variably found in the proximal epiphyseal ends of long bones such as the femur and humerus. In circumstances of chronic hypoxia, the body can convert yellow marrow back to red marrow to increase blood cell production.

Hematopoietic components

At the cellular level, the main functional component of bone marrow includes the progenitor cells which are destined to mature into blood and lymphoid cells. Human marrow produces approximately 500 billion blood cells per day. Marrow contains hematopoietic stem cells which give rise to the three classes of blood cells that are found in circulation: white blood cells (leukocytes), red blood cells (erythrocytes), and platelets (thrombocytes).

Stroma
The stroma of the bone marrow includes all tissue not directly involved in the marrow's primary function of hematopoiesis. Stromal cells may be indirectly involved in hematopoiesis, providing a microenvironment that influences the function and differentiation of hematopoietic cells. For instance, they generate colony stimulating factors, which have a significant effect on hematopoiesis. Cell types that constitute the bone marrow stroma include:
 fibroblasts (reticular connective tissue)
 macrophages, which contribute especially to red blood cell production, as they deliver iron for hemoglobin production.
 adipocytes (fat cells)
 osteoblasts (synthesize bone)
 osteoclasts (resorb bone)
 endothelial cells, which form the sinusoids. These derive from endothelial stem cells, which are also present in the bone marrow.

Function

Mesenchymal stem cells

The bone marrow stroma contains mesenchymal stem cells (MSCs), which are also known as marrow stromal cells. These are multipotent stem cells that can differentiate into a variety of cell types. MSCs have been shown to differentiate, in vitro or in vivo, into osteoblasts, chondrocytes, myocytes, marrow adipocytes and beta-pancreatic islets cells.

Bone marrow barrier
The blood vessels of the bone marrow constitute a barrier, inhibiting immature blood cells from leaving the marrow. Only mature blood cells contain the membrane proteins, such as aquaporin and glycophorin, that are required to attach to and pass the blood vessel endothelium. Hematopoietic stem cells may also cross the bone marrow barrier, and may thus be harvested from blood.

Lymphatic role
The red bone marrow is a key element of the lymphatic system, being one of the primary lymphoid organs that generate lymphocytes from immature hematopoietic progenitor cells. The bone marrow and thymus constitute the primary lymphoid tissues involved in the production and early selection of lymphocytes. Furthermore, bone marrow performs a valve-like function to prevent the backflow of lymphatic fluid in the lymphatic system.

Compartmentalization
Biological compartmentalization is evident within the bone marrow, in that certain cell types tend to aggregate in specific areas. For instance, erythrocytes, macrophages, and their precursors tend to gather around blood vessels, while granulocytes gather at the borders of the bone marrow.

As food

People have used animal bone-marrow  in cuisine worldwide for millennia, as in the famed  Milanese  Ossobuco.

Marrow oil 

An 1892 text provides the following instructions and comments on hair oil:

Marrow oil.-
  Clarified beef marrow ........ oz.
  Oil of almonds ....................  pt.
Melt them together, and scent the mixture at will. Held in high repute as a hair oil by many. That of the shops has seldom any marrow in it, but lard instead. The appropriate scents are the same as for  bears' grease. It is generally tinged slightly yellow by means of a little palm oil or annatto.

Clinical significance

Disease
The normal bone marrow architecture can be damaged or displaced by aplastic anemia, malignancies such as multiple myeloma, or infections such as tuberculosis, leading to a decrease in the production of blood cells and blood platelets. The bone marrow can also be affected by various forms of leukemia, which attacks its hematologic progenitor cells. Furthermore, exposure to radiation or chemotherapy will kill many of the rapidly dividing cells of the bone marrow, and will therefore result in a depressed immune system. Many of the symptoms of radiation poisoning are due to damage sustained by the bone marrow cells.

To diagnose diseases involving the bone marrow, a bone marrow aspiration is sometimes performed. This typically involves using a hollow needle to acquire a sample of red bone marrow from the crest of the ilium under general or local anesthesia.

Application of stem cells in therapeutics

Bone marrow derived stem cells have a wide array of application in regenerative medicine.

Imaging
Medical imaging may provide a limited amount of information regarding bone marrow. Plain film x-rays pass through soft tissues such as marrow and do not provide visualization, although any changes in the structure of the associated bone may be detected. CT imaging has somewhat better capacity for assessing the marrow cavity of bones, although with low sensitivity and specificity. For example, normal fatty "yellow" marrow in adult long bones is of low density (-30 to -100 Hounsfield units), between subcutaneous fat and soft tissue. Tissue with increased cellular composition, such as normal "red" marrow or cancer cells within the medullary cavity will measure variably higher in density.

MRI is more sensitive and specific for assessing bone composition. MRI enables assessment of the average molecular composition of soft tissues and thus provides information regarding the relative fat content of marrow. In adult humans, "yellow" fatty marrow is the dominant tissue in bones, particularly in the (peripheral) appendicular skeleton. Because fat molecules have a high T1-relaxivity, T1-weighted imaging sequences show "yellow" fatty marrow as bright (hyperintense). Furthermore, normal fatty marrow loses signal on fat-saturation sequences, in a similar pattern to subcutaneous fat.

When "yellow" fatty marrow becomes replaced by tissue with more cellular composition, this change is apparent as decreased brightness on T1-weighted sequences. Both normal "red" marrow and pathologic marrow lesions (such as cancer) are darker than "yellow" marrow on T1-weight sequences, although can often be distinguished by comparison with the MR signal intensity of adjacent soft tissues. Normal "red" marrow is typically equivalent or brighter than skeletal muscle or intervertebral disc on T1-weighted sequences.

Fatty marrow change, the inverse of red marrow hyperplasia, can occur with normal aging, though it can also be seen with certain treatments such as radiation therapy. Diffuse marrow T1 hypointensity without contrast enhancement or cortical discontinuity suggests red marrow conversion or myelofibrosis. Falsely normal marrow on T1 can be seen with diffuse multiple myeloma or leukemic infiltration when the water to fat ratio is not sufficiently altered, as may be seen with lower grade tumors or earlier in the disease process.

Histology

Bone marrow examination is the pathologic analysis of samples of bone marrow obtained via biopsy and bone marrow aspiration. Bone marrow examination is used in the diagnosis of a number of conditions, including leukemia, multiple myeloma, anemia, and pancytopenia. The bone marrow produces the cellular elements of the blood, including platelets, red blood cells and white blood cells. While much information can be gleaned by testing the blood itself (drawn from a vein by phlebotomy), it is sometimes necessary to examine the source of the blood cells in the bone marrow to obtain more information on hematopoiesis; this is the role of bone marrow aspiration and biopsy.

The ratio between myeloid series and erythroid cells is relevant to bone marrow function, and also to diseases of the bone marrow and peripheral blood, such as leukemia and anemia. The normal myeloid-to-erythroid ratio is around 3:1; this ratio may increase in myelogenous leukemias, decrease in polycythemias, and reverse in cases of thalassemia.

Donation and transplantation

In a bone marrow transplant, hematopoietic stem cells are removed from a person and infused into another person (allogenic) or into the same person at a later time (autologous). If the donor and recipient are compatible, these infused cells will then travel to the bone marrow and initiate blood cell production. Transplantation from one person to another is conducted for the treatment of severe bone marrow diseases, such as congenital defects, autoimmune diseases or malignancies. The patient's own marrow is first killed off with drugs or radiation, and then the new stem cells are introduced. Before radiation therapy or chemotherapy in cases of cancer, some of the patient's hematopoietic stem cells are sometimes harvested and later infused back when the therapy is finished to restore the immune system.

Bone marrow stem cells can be induced to become neural cells to treat neurological illnesses, and can also potentially be used for the treatment of other illnesses, such as inflammatory bowel disease. In 2013, following a clinical trial, scientists proposed that bone marrow transplantation could be used to treat HIV in conjunction with antiretroviral drugs; however, it was later found that HIV remained in the bodies of the test subjects.

Harvesting
The stem cells are typically harvested directly from the red marrow in the iliac crest, often under general anesthesia. The procedure is minimally invasive and does not require stitches afterwards. Depending on the donor's health and reaction to the procedure, the actual harvesting can be an outpatient procedure, or can require 1–2 days of recovery in the hospital.

Another option is to administer certain drugs that stimulate the release of stem cells from the bone marrow into circulating blood. An intravenous catheter is inserted into the donor's arm, and the stem cells are then filtered out of the blood. This procedure is similar to that used in blood or platelet donation. In adults, bone marrow may also be taken from the sternum, while the tibia is often used when taking samples from infants. In newborns, stem cells may be retrieved from the umbilical cord.

Persistent viruses
Using quantitative Polymerase Chain Reaction (qPCR) and Next-generation Sequencing (NGS) a maximum of five DNA viruses per individual have been identified. Included were several herpesviruses, hepatitis B virus, Merkel cell polyomavirus, and human papillomavirus 31. Given the reactivation and/or oncogenic potential of these viruses, their repercussion on hematopoietic and malignant disorders calls for further studies.

Fossil record

The earliest fossilised evidence of bone marrow was discovered in 2014 in Eusthenopteron, a lobe-finned fish which lived during the Devonian period approximately 370 million years ago. Scientists from Uppsala University and the European Synchrotron Radiation Facility used X-ray synchrotron microtomography to study the fossilised interior of the skeleton's humerus, finding organised tubular structures akin to modern vertebrate bone marrow. Eusthenopteron is closely related to the early tetrapods, which ultimately evolved into the land-dwelling mammals and lizards of the present day.

See also
 LOC100272216 protein
 Myelonecrosis
 National Marrow Donor Program
 Gift of Life Marrow Registry

References

Further reading
 Nature Bone Marrow Transplantation (Nature Publishing Group) – specialist scientific journal with articles on bone marrow biology and clinical uses.

External links

 Bone marrow histology photomicrographs

 
Hematopoiesis
Endocrine system
Lymphoid organ
Lymphatic system
Skeletal system
Stem cells